Purushottam Chakraborty is an Indian physicist who is one of the renowned experts in materials analysis using ion beams and secondary ion mass spectrometry (SIMS).

He is a former senior professor of Physics at Saha Institute of Nuclear Physics, Kolkata, India & former adjunct professor of Physics at University of Pretoria, South Africa.

Scientific career
Prof Chakraborty did his Ph.D. on the "Design and development of a radio-frequency (RF) quadrupole mass spectrometer (QMS) for the study of secondary-ions emitted from ion-bombarded metal surfaces". The QMS was initially fabricated by Profs S D Dey, S B Karmohapatro and B M Banerjee at Saha Institute of Nuclear Physics, Kolkata, India.

Prof Chakraborty upgraded the equipment by appropriately lowering the frequency of the RF voltage so that the QMS could handle the masses above 200 amu and also by converting the system into a full-fledged UHV-based Secondary Ion Mass Spectrometry (SIMS) Setup at Saha Institute of Nuclear Physics, Kolkata. Making use of the indigenous SIMS instrument, he initiated the experimental research on Ion-Matter Interactions, for which he was awarded "Premchand Roychand Scholarship (PRS)" and conferred “Mouat Medal” by the University of Calcutta in 1986. Later, he pursued research on Atomic Collisions in Solids, Inelastic Ion-Surface Collisions and Ion-Beam Modifications & Analysis of Materials. His other research areas include Low-Dimensional Materials and Nanoscale Systems, X-UV Optics, Optoelectronics, Nonlinear Optics, Photonics, Plasmonics, etc. 

Prof Chakraborty's work on the fabrication of ‘layered Synthetic Microstructures (LSM)’, at the FOM-Institute for Atomic and Molecular Physics – Amsterdam (AMOLF), in collaboration with the Philips Research Laboratories Netherlands, was recognized as a pioneering contribution in the “realization of optical devices for the extreme ultraviolet to soft X-rays”.

The methodology of fabricating aspherically-curved mirrors for reflecting soft x-rays at near-normal incidence was employed to construct ‘Soft X-ray Telescopes’ for imaging Solar Corona and Solar Flakes in the X-UV domain of electromagnetic spectrum. The European Space Agency, Netherlands also used this technique for reflecting X-rays with wavelengths of 1.85 and 10 to 17 Angstroms.

Prof. Chakraborty's “Alkali-element based MCsn+ Molecular-ion SIMS” approach has been used for the quantitative analysis of materials without calibration standards, in general and for the composition analysis of surfaces and interfaces of ultrathin films, superlattices and nanostructured materials, in particular. The technique has been recognized as an important contribution in the  field of ion-beam analysis of materials.
 
Prof Chakraborty's work on ‘Ion-beam Synthesis of Metal-Glass Nanocomposites’ has led to the development of novel photonic materials, thereby opening the way for advances in all-optical switching, coupled waveguides and optical computation.

Professor Chakraborty visited and delivered invited lectures at various renowned universities and research institutes across the globe such as Imperial College London, UK; Vanderbilt University, USA; Yale University, USA; Asian Institute of Technology, Thailand; Kyoto University, Japan; and CERN (Geneva), Switzerland to name a few.

Prof Chakraborty was the visiting professor of Pontifical Catholic University of Rio de Janeiro, Brazil; Osaka Electro-Communication University, Japan; Universite Laval, Quebec, Canada; Friedrich Schiller University, Jena, Germany; University of Padova, Italy; International Centre for Theoretical Physics (ICTP), Trieste, Italy; FOM - Institute for Atomic and Molecular Physics, The Netherlands to name a few.

Awards and recognition
Adjudged the “Most Eminent Mass Spectrometrist of India' by the Indian Society for Mass Spectrometry (ISMS) for his outstanding contributions in SIMS
Conferred “Gold Medal” in 2003 by the Chairman, Atomic Energy Commission, Government of India
Premchand Roychand Scholar of the University of Calcutta (1979)
Mouat Silver Medal – Awarded by the University of Calcutta (1986)
Fellow, West Bengal Academy of Science and Technology
Fellow, Indian Chemical Society

Keynote speeches
Prof Chakraborty organized and delivered keynote address at various international conferences; to name a few:
16th International Workshop on Inelastic Ion-Surface Collisions (IISC-16) Sep. 17 - 22, 2006 Hernstein, A-2560 Hernstein, Austria
7th Asian International Seminar on Atomic and Molecular Physics, December 4 – 7, IIT-Madras, India
International Summit on Current Trends in Mass Spectrometry, July 13 – 15, 2015, New Orleans, USA
8th World Congress on Spectroscopy and Analytical Techniques, September (11 – 12), 2018, Stockholm, Sweden
9th World Congress on Spectroscopy and Analytical Techniques, March (06 – 07), 2019, Paris, France
International Webinar on Mass Spectrometry and Separation Techniques, London, March (05 – 06), 2021
“Professor Hiralal Das Memorial Lecture”, Physics Department, Rajiv Gandhi University, Arunachal Pradesh, India, November 11, 2021
4th Edition of World Nanotechnology Conference (World Nano 2021), Las Vegas, Nevada, USA, April 25 – 27, 2022
Global Conference on Nanotechnology, Madrid, Spain (NanoSeries 2022), June 21 - 24, 2022
30th National Conference on Condensed Matter Physics, National Institute of Technology (NIT) – Nagaland, December 14 – 16, 2022 (Plenary Speaker)

Publications
Purushottam Chakraborty has published more than 100 research papers in international journals that includes 
monographs, reviews and book-chapters.
Purushottam Chakraborty, MCsn+-SIMS: An Innovative Approach for Direct Compositional Analysis of Materials without Standards, Energy Procedia, Volume 41, (2013), p. 80-109
M P Bruijn, Prof. Chakraborty, J. Verhoeven, H W van Essen, M. J. van der Wiel, Automatic electron-beam deposition of multilayer soft x-ray coatings with laterally graded d-spacing, Optical Engineering 25, 916 (1986)
Purushottam Chakraborty, Layered synthetic microstructures as optical elements for the extreme ultraviolet and soft X-rays, Int. J. Mod. Phys B 5, (1991), p:2133-2228
Biswajit Saha, Purushottam Chakraborty, Hubert Gnaser, Manjula Sharma and Milan K Sanyal, Exact compositional analysis of SiGe alloys by matrix effect compensated MCs+-SIMS, Appl Phys A 108, 671 (2012)
P. Chakraborty, Metal nanoclusters in glasses as non-linear photonic materials, Journal of Materials Science (Kluwer Academic Publishers) Volume 33, p: 2235-2249 (1998)
Binita Ghosh and Purushottam Chakraborty, Optical Nonlinearities of Colloidal Metal Quantum Dot – Glass Composites for Nanophotonics (Book: Nanocomposites and Polymers with Analytical Methods) (Edited by John Cuppoletti, Intech Publishers) (2011)
Journal of Physics: Conference Series (IOP Publications, UK), Volume 80 (Edited by Pranawa C Deshmukh, Purushottam Chakraborty and Jim F Williams), (2006)
Metal Quantum Dot – Glass Composites as Nonlinear Optical Materials for Photonic Applications, 2022, Binita Ghosh and Purushottam Chakraborty

Books edited
“Ion Beam Analysis of Surfaces and Interfaces of Condensed Matter Systems” (Edited by Purushottam Chakraborty), Nova Science Publishers, New York, 2002, 
Photonic Materials (Section 6; Encyclopaedia of Materials: Electronics), Elsevier Science USA, 1st Edition, January 1, 2023:

References

Indian physicists
Living people
Bengali physicists
Bengali scientists
Presidency University, Kolkata alumni
1953 births